Lennart Beijer (born 1947), is a Swedish Left Party politician, member of the Riksdag 1994–2006.

References

1947 births
20th-century Swedish politicians
21st-century Swedish politicians
Living people
Members of the Riksdag 1994–1998
Members of the Riksdag 1998–2002
Members of the Riksdag 2002–2006
Members of the Riksdag from the Left Party (Sweden)